Paul Leroy Larson (March 19, 1932 – October 29, 2022) was an American football player. A native of Turlock, California, Larson played college football at the quarterback position for the California Golden Bears football team. He was selected by the Football Writers Association of America as the first-team quarterback on its 1954 College Football All-America Team.  He was selected by the Chicago Cardinals in the eighth round (86th overall pick) of the 1954 NFL Draft and played for the Cardinals in five games during the 1957 NFL season. He later appeared in one game for the Oakland Raiders in 1960.

Larson died in Turlock on October 29, 2022, at the age of 90.

See also
 List of NCAA major college football yearly passing leaders
 List of NCAA major college football yearly total offense leaders

References

1932 births
2022 deaths
American football quarterbacks
California Golden Bears football players
Chicago Cardinals players
Oakland Raiders players
People from Turlock, California
Players of American football from California
American Football League players